Blue Bay may refer to:

 Blue Bay, New South Wales, a suburb of the Central Coast region of New South Wales, Australia
 Blue Bay, Curaçao, a bay of the Caribbean island of Curaçao
 Blue Bay, Taiwan, a bay of the Asian island of Taiwan
 Blue Bay Marine Park, a bay of the African island of Mauritius